Killian Basba Geeke Nikiema (born 22 June 2003) is a professional footballer who plays as goalkeeper for ADO Den Haag. Born in the Netherlands, he represents the Burkina Faso national team.

Club career
Nikiema began playing football with the youth academy of Voorschoten '97 at the age of 4 and played as winger, before switching to become a goalkeeper at 15. He joined the youth academy of ADO Den Haag in 2016, and signed his first professional contract with them on 9 May 2019.

International career
Nikema was born in the Netherlands to a Burkinabé father and Dutch mother, and is a youth international for the Netherlands. Nikiema made his professional debut for the Burkina Faso national team in a friendly 1–0 win over Libya on 4 September 2019.

References

External links
 
 

2003 births
Living people
Citizens of Burkina Faso through descent
Burkinabé people of Dutch descent
Dutch people of Burkinabé descent
Sportspeople of Burkinabé descent
Burkinabé footballers
Dutch footballers
Association football goalkeepers
Burkina Faso international footballers
Netherlands youth international footballers
2021 Africa Cup of Nations players
ADO Den Haag players
21st-century Burkinabé people